Thomas Boudat (born 24 February 1994) is a French racing cyclist, who currently rides for UCI Continental team . In June 2017, he was named in the startlist for the Tour de France.

Major results

Track

2011
 National Junior Championships
2nd Madison (with Yoän Vérardo)
3rd Team pursuit
 3rd  Team pursuit, UEC European Junior Championships
2012
 1st  Points, UEC European Junior Championships
 National Junior Championships
1st  Individual pursuit
1st  Madison (with Clément Barbeau)
1st  Team pursuit
2nd Points race
2013
 1st Madison (with Vivien Brisse), UCI World Cup, Aguascalientes
 UEC European Under-23 Championships
1st  Madison (with Bryan Coquard)
1st  Points
3rd  Omnium
 National Championships
1st  Omnium
1st  Points
1st  Team pursuit
2nd Scratch
3rd Individual pursuit
 2nd  Points, UEC European Championships
2014
 1st  Omnium, UCI World Championships
 National Championships
1st  Omnium
1st  Scratch
1st  Team pursuit
2nd Individual pursuit
2nd Madison (with Lucas Destang)
 1st Trois Jours de Grenoble (with Vivien Brisse)
 UEC European Under-23 Championships
2nd  Points
3rd  Madison (with Marc Fournier)
2015
 National Championships
1st  Madison (with Bryan Coquard)
1st  Points
1st  Team pursuit
 UEC European Under-23 Championships
2nd  Madison (with Benjamin Thomas)
3rd  Omnium
2016
 1st Omnium, UCI Track World Cup, Hong Kong
 1st  Omnium, UEC European Under-23 Championships
 National Championships
1st  Points
1st  Scratch
3rd Madison (with Nicolas Boudat)
2017
 National Championships
1st  Madison (with Sylvain Chavanel)
1st  Scratch
3rd Omnium
3rd Points
2018
 National Championships
1st  Omnium
1st  Scratch
2nd Madison (with Sylvain Chavanel)
3rd Team pursuit
2019
 1st Six Days of Rotterdam (with Niki Terpstra)
2021
 2nd  Team pursuit, UCI World Championships

Road

2011
 4th Bernaudeau Junior
2012
 7th Road race, UCI World Junior Championships
 8th Bernaudeau Junior
2013
 National University Championships
1st  Road race
2nd Time trial
 1st Circuit des vins du Blayais
 1st Stage 3 Tour des Mauges
 1st Stage 3 (TTT) Tour de Seine Maritime
 7th Road race, Mediterranean Games
2014
 1st ZLM Tour
 2nd La Côte Picarde
 4th Road race, UEC European Under-23 Championships
 5th Overall Paris–Arras Tour
2015
 1st Classica Corsica
 9th Grand Prix Impanis-Van Petegem
2016
 2nd Grand Prix de Denain
 3rd Overall Boucles de la Mayenne
1st  Young rider classification
 8th La Roue Tourangelle
2017
 1st Grand Prix de la Ville de Lillers
 1st Paris–Chauny
 1st Stage 3 Settimana Internazionale di Coppi e Bartali
 2nd Paris–Troyes
 2nd Classic Loire-Atlantique
 5th Tour de Vendée
 8th Route Adélie
2018
 1st Cholet-Pays de la Loire
 1st Stage 1 Vuelta a Andalucía
 3rd Brussels Cycling Classic
 7th Tour de Vendée
2019
 1st Circuit de Wallonie
 3rd Cholet-Pays de la Loire
 4th La Roue Tourangelle
 5th Grand Prix Pino Cerami
 6th Clásica de Almería
 6th Grand Prix of Aargau Canton
 8th Route Adélie
 9th Bredene Koksijde Classic
2020
 5th Grote Prijs Jean-Pierre Monseré
 10th Clásica de Almería
2021
 2nd Grand Prix La Marseillaise
 6th Grote Prijs Jean-Pierre Monseré
 8th Cholet-Pays de la Loire
2022
 4th La Roue Tourangelle
 6th Cholet-Pays de la Loire

Grand Tour general classification results timeline

References

External links

1994 births
Living people
French male cyclists
People from Langon, Gironde
UCI Track Cycling World Champions (men)
Olympic cyclists of France
Cyclists at the 2016 Summer Olympics
French track cyclists
Sportspeople from Gironde
European Games competitors for France
Cyclists at the 2015 European Games
Competitors at the 2013 Mediterranean Games
Mediterranean Games competitors for France
Cyclists from Nouvelle-Aquitaine